Sisters of the Destitute (S. D.) is a Syro-Malabar Catholic women's religious institute.

History

The Congregation of the Sisters of the Destitute was founded by Venerable Mar Varghese Payyappilly Palakkappilly in Chunangamvely, Kerala on 19 March 1927.

It includes over 1,500 nuns and is composed of physicians, nurses, lawyers, teachers and social workers. Now it is working in Asia, Europe, Africa and the USA. One of the branch in Kayakkunn near Panamaram, Wayanad District.

Sisters of the Destitute runs many institutions like :
 Homes for the sick and the needy
 Rehabilitation centres for mentally and physically handicapped children
 Health centres for AIDS and cancer patients
 Dispensary for the poor
 Libraries
 Nursing homes
 Schools
 Hospitals

References

External links
 Servant of God
 Servant of God 
 Short Biography of Mar Varghese Payyappilly Palakkappilly in Malayalam
 Official home page of S.D.

Catholic female orders and societies
1927 establishments in India
Syro-Malabar Catholic Church